Lukáš Lacko was the defending champion, but lost to Jan-Lennard Struff in quarterfinals. 
Jarkko Nieminen won the title, beating Ričardas Berankis in the final, 6–3, 6–1.

Seeds

Draw

Finals

Top half

Bottom half

References 
 Main draw
 Qualifying draw

IPP Open - Singles
2013 Singles